The Ridge-and-Valley Appalachians, also called the Ridge and Valley Province or the Valley and Ridge Appalachians, are a physiographic province of the larger Appalachian division and are also a belt within the Appalachian Mountains extending from southeastern New York in the north through northwestern New Jersey, westward into Pennsylvania through the Lehigh Valley, and southward into Maryland, West Virginia, Virginia, Kentucky, Tennessee, Georgia, and Alabama. They form a broad arc between the Blue Ridge Mountains and the Appalachian Plateau physiographic province (the Allegheny and Cumberland plateaus). They are characterized by long, even ridges, with long, continuous valleys in between.

The river valleys were areas of indigenous settlements for thousands of years. In the historic period, the Cherokee people had towns along many of the rivers in western South Carolina and North Carolina, as well as on the western side of the Appalachian Mountains in present-day Tennessee. Similarly, the Catawba people occupied areas along the upper Catawba River in Western North Carolina, to the east of Cherokee County.

The ridge and valley system presents an important obstacle to east–west land travel even with today's technology. It was a nearly insurmountable barrier to European-American migrants who walked or rode horses traveling west to settle the Ohio Country, and later the Northwest Territory and Oregon Country. In the era when animal power dominated transportation, there was no safe way to cross east–west in the middle of the range; crossing was only possible nearer its extremes except for a few rough passages opened mid-range during the colonial era, such as Cumberland Gap, Braddock's Road and Forbes Road. These were later improved as America's first National Roads (respectively Wilderness Road, Cumberland Road, Lincoln Highway or designated U.S. 40 and U.S. 30 in later years). Early settlers of the Ohio country tended to enter it via the Ohio River; river systems were the most important transportation corridors. It was difficult in the late 19th and 20th centuries to construct railroads and modern highways through this area.

Geography
The eastern head of the Ridge and Valley region is marked by the Great Appalachian Valley, which lies just west of the Blue Ridge. The western side of the Ridge and Valley region is marked by steep escarpments such as the Allegheny Front, the Cumberland Mountains, and Walden Ridge. The Valley and Ridge is located on the west side of the Blue Ridge Mountains.

Geology

These curious formations are the remnants of an ancient fold-and-thrust belt, west of the mountain core that formed in the Alleghenian orogeny. Here, strata have been folded westward, and forced over massive thrust faults; there is little metamorphism, and no igneous intrusion. The ridges represent the edges of the erosion-resistant strata, and the valleys portray the absence of the more erodible strata. Smaller streams have developed their valleys following the lines of the more easily eroded strata. But a few major rivers, such as the Delaware River, the Susquehanna River, the New River, and the Potomac River, are evidently older than the present mountains, having cut water gaps that are perpendicular to hard strata ridges. The evidence points to a wearing down of the entire region (the original mountains) to a low level with little relief, so that major rivers were flowing in unconsolidated sediments that were unaffected by the underlying rock structure. Then the region was uplifted slowly enough that the rivers were able to maintain their course, cutting through the ridges as they developed.

Valleys may be synclinal valleys or anticlinal valleys.

These mountains are at their highest development in central Pennsylvania, a phenomenon termed the Pennsylvania climax.

Significant ridges (from north to south)

Photo gallery

See also
 Geology of the Appalachians
 Allegheny Front
 Eastern Continental Divide
 Tennessee Valley Divide

References

 Stanley, Steven M. Earth System History. New York: W.H. Freeman and Company, 1999. 

Subranges of the Appalachian Mountains
Ridges of the United States
Valleys of the United States
Geography of the Lehigh Valley
Eastern United States
Geography of Appalachia
Ridges of Alabama
Ridges of Georgia (U.S. state)
Ridges of Kentucky
Ridges of Maryland
Ridges of New Jersey
Ridges of New York (state)
Ridges of Pennsylvania
Ridges of Tennessee
Ridges of Virginia
Ridges of West Virginia
Regions of Alabama
Regions of Georgia (U.S. state)
Regions of Kentucky
Regions of New York (state)
Regions of Ohio
Regions of Maryland
Regions of New Jersey
Regions of Pennsylvania
Regions of Tennessee
Regions of Virginia
Regions of West Virginia
Physiographic provinces
Physiographic regions of the United States